A Fahnestock clip is an early type of spring clamp electrical terminal for connections to bare wires. It is still used in educational electronic kits and teaching laboratories in schools. It is designed to grip a bare wire securely, yet release it with the push of a tab.

It consists of a single flat piece of springy metal, bent over itself to form a clip.   Pushing down on the end of the metal tab opens a hole through which a bare or stripped wire can be inserted.  Releasing pressure allows the tab to spring back, closing the hole and gripping the wire to form an electrically sound mechanical connection.  Pushing the tab again releases the grip on the wire so it can be withdrawn.

Modern banana plugs will usually fit into a Fahnestock clip, although the fit is tight.

Fahnestock clips were commonly made of phosphor bronze or spring steel and plated with tin or copper for good electrical conductivity and corrosion-resistance. Most Fahnestock clips seen today are nickel-plated.

Fahnestock clips were seen on early radio receiver breadboard construction, model train power connections, and the like. They were also available on early dry batteries. Today, they have largely been supplanted by binding posts. However, they remain in use in elementary schools especially, where their ease of use and visible connections make them a popular way for science instructors to teach the creation of simple circuits, and most university physics departments still have them on apparatus.

Fahnestock clips are also used as safety devices on the arming wires of aircraft bombs; their grip on smooth bare steel wire is sufficient to prevent the wire from being withdrawn from a fuze during normal handling but light enough to allow the wire to be withdrawn when the weapon is released.

References

Electrical signal connectors
DC power connectors